Polk County is a county located in the U.S. state of Arkansas. As of the 2020 census, the population was 19,221. The county seat is Mena. Polk County is Arkansas's 48th county, formed on November 30, 1844; it was named for James K. Polk, 11th President of the United States.

Wet County
Formerly an alcohol prohibition or dry county. However, following a historic mid-term election, Polk County is now a wet county.

Geography

Major highways

 Future Interstate 49
 U.S. Highway 59
 U.S. Highway 71
 U.S. Highway 270
 U.S. Highway 278
 Highway 4
 Highway 8
 Highway 84
 Highway 88

Adjacent counties
Scott County (north)
Montgomery County (east)
Howard County (southeast)
Sevier County (south)
McCurtain County, Oklahoma (southwest)
Le Flore County, Oklahoma (northwest)

National protected area
 Ouachita National Forest (part)

Demographics

2020 census

As of the 2020 United States census, there were 19,221 people, 8,243 households, and 5,672 families residing in the county.

2000 census
As of the 2000 census, there were 20,229 people, 8,047 households, and 5,793 families residing in the county. The population density was 24 people per square mile (9/km2). There were 9,236 housing units at an average density of 11 per square mile (4/km2). The racial makeup of the county was 94.69% White, 0.16% Black or African American, 1.49% Native American, 0.21% Asian, 0.06% Pacific Islander, 1.72% from other races, and 1.67% from two or more races. 3.50% of the population were Hispanic or Latino of any race.

There were 8,047 households, out of which 31.90% had children under the age of 18 living with them, 60.40% were married couples living together, 8.40% had a female householder with no husband present, and 28.00% were non-families. 25.00% of all households were made up of individuals, and 12.30% had someone living alone who was 65 years of age or older. The average household size was 2.49 and the average family size was 2.97.

In the county, the population was spread out, with 25.60% under the age of 18, 7.90% from 18 to 24, 25.00% from 25 to 44, 24.50% from 45 to 64, and 17.00% who were 65 years of age or older. The median age was 39 years. For every 100 females there were 97.00 males. For every 100 females age 18 and over, there were 94.00 males.

The median income for a household in the county was $25,180, and the median income for a family was $31,379. Males had a median income of $23,397 versus $17,294 for females. The per capita income for the county was $14,063. 18.20% of the population and 14.00% of families were below the poverty line. Out of the total people living in poverty, 23.50% were under the age of 18 and 16.20% were 65 or older.

As of 2010 Polk County had a population of 20,662. Of this population 89.77% were non-Hispanic whites, 0.31% were blacks, 1.76% Native Americans, 0.45% Asians, 2.03% non-Hispanics reporting one or more race and 5.76% Hispanic or Latino.

Government
Since 1952, Polk County has been heavily Republican, only voting for the Democratic nominee for president three times since then. It last voted for the Democratic nominee for president in 1992, when it gave Arkansas governor Bill Clinton 43.8 percent of the vote. After this, the county trended rapidly towards Republicans, with the Republican margin of victory increasing in every subsequent election. In 2020, the county gave Republican Presidential nominee Donald Trump 82.9 percent of the vote, the highest ever vote share for a Republican presidential candidate in the county, and Democratic nominee Joe Biden 14.7 percent of the vote, the lowest ever vote share for a Democratic presidential candidate in the county.

Popular culture

Polk County is the setting for Stephen Hunter's fictional Bob Lee Swagger series, the most notable being Black Light, as well as the place where Joel B Reed's fictional character, Jazz Phillips, of the Jazz Phillips mystery series, grew up.

Communities

Cities
Mena (county seat)
Wickes

Towns
Cove
Grannis
Hatfield
Vandervoort

Census-designated places
 Acorn
 Board Camp

Other unincorporated communities
Ink

Townships

 Acorn (small part of Mena)
 Big Fork
 Cedar
 Center (most of Mena)
 Cove (Hatfield)
 Eagle
 Faulkner
 Freedom
 Fulton
 Gap Springs
 Mill Creek
 Mountain
 Ouachita
 Ozark (Grannis, Wickes)
 Potter (small part of Mena)
 Rich Mountain
 White (Cove, Vandervoort)

See also
 List of lakes in Polk County, Arkansas
 National Register of Historic Places listings in Polk County, Arkansas
 Osro Cobb

References

External links
 Polk County, Arkansas entry on the Encyclopedia of Arkansas History & Culture

 
1844 establishments in Arkansas
Populated places established in 1844